Madhupur subdivision is an administrative subdivision of the Deoghar district in the Santhal Pargana division in the state of Jharkhand, India.

History
As a result of the Santhal rebellion, Act XXXVII of 1855 was passed by the British Raj, and a separate district called Santhal Pargana was carved out of parts of Birbhum and Bhagalpur districts. Santhal Pargana had four sub-districts – Dumka, Godda, Deoghar and Rajmahal. Subsequently, Santal Pargana district comprised Dumka, Deoghar, Sahibganj, Godda, Pakur and Jamtara sub-divisions. In 1983 Deoghar, Sahibganj  and Godda subdivisions were given district status.

Administrative set up
Deoghar district has two subdivisions: Deoghar and Madhupur. Madhupur, Margomunda, Karon, Sarath, Palojori community development blocks and Madhupur town are in Madhupur subdivision.

Note: The website of the district administration mentions two subdivisions with their names, but does not mention the names of the CD blocks in each subdivision. The District Census Handbook, Deoghar, mentions only 8 CD blocks (4 in each subdivision), and leaves out 2 CD blocks. According to the map of the district, among the two left out blocks, it seems logical that Sonaraithari CD block is in Deoghar subdivision and Margomunda CD block is in Madhupur subdivision.

Deoghar district has two subdivisions:

Demographics
According to the 2011 Census of India data, Madhupur subdivision, in Deoghar district, had a total population of 696,251. There were 358,608 (52%) males and 337,643 (48%) females. Scheduled castes numbered 77,962 (11.20%) and scheduled tribes numbered 101,443 (14.57%). Literacy rate was 46.28%.

See also – List of Jharkhand districts ranked by literacy rate

Police stations
Police stations in Madhupur subdivision are at:
 Madhupur
 Madhupur Mahila
 Chitra
 Margomunda
 Palojori
 Sarath

Blocks
Community development blocks in Madhupur subdivision are:

Education
In 2011, in the CD blocks of Madhupur subdivision out of a total 1,083 inhabited villages there were 198 villages with pre-primary schools, 763 villages with primary schools, 273 villages with middle schools, 30 villages with secondary schools, 13 villages with senior secondary schools, 2 villages with non-formal training centres, 306 villages with no educational facility.
.*Senior secondary schools are also known as Inter colleges in Jharkhand

Healthcare
In 2011, in the CD blocks of Madhupur subdivision there were 19 villages with primary health centres, 70 villages with primary health subcentres, 12 villages with maternity and child welfare centres, 17 villages with allopathic hospitals, 13 villages with dispensaries, 2 villages with veterinary hospitals, 6 villages with family welfare centres, 114 villages with medicine shops.
.*Private medical practitioners, alternative medicine etc. not included

References

Sub-divisions in Jharkhand